Saint-Julien-en-Beauchêne (Vivaro-Alpine: Sant Julian de Buechaine) is a commune in the Hautes-Alpes department in southeastern France.

It is popular for skiing during the winter and for walks in the mountains during the summer.

Population

See also
Communes of the Hautes-Alpes department

References

Communes of Hautes-Alpes